Nard Ndoka was the minister of health of Albania from March 2007 to August 2008.  He started his political career with Democratic Party in the early 1990 . Now he is the leader of the Demochristian Party of Albania, which is now in coalition with the Democratic Party.

References 

Albanian Christians
Living people
Demochristian Party of Albania politicians
Health ministers of Albania
Political party leaders of Albania
1963 births